, otherwise known by his mononym , is a Japanese actor and voice actor probably best known for providing the voice of Orga Sabnak in Gundam Seed and portraying Shuichi Kitaoka/Kamen Rider Zolda in Kamen Rider Ryuki.

Filmography

Anime roles

Live-Action roles

External links
From First Production Profile 
Ryohei's Life Style Official Blog

References

1973 births
Living people
Japanese male television actors
Japanese male voice actors
Male voice actors from Hyōgo Prefecture
Male voice actors from Osaka